Abbotsbury is a village and civil parish in the English county of Dorset. The village, including Chesil Beach, the swannery and subtropical gardens, is owned by the Ilchester Estate, which owns  of land in Dorset. In the 2011 census the civil parish had a population of 481.

Abbotsbury is known for its swannery, subtropical gardens and surviving abbey buildings, including St Catherine's Chapel, a 14th-century pilgrimage chapel that stands on a hill between the village and the coast.

Geography

Abbotsbury is connected to those towns by the B3157, which is the main road running through the village. The coastline within Abbotsbury civil parish is part of the Jurassic Coast, a World Heritage Site. All of Abbotsbury parish is within the Dorset Area of Outstanding Natural Beauty.

History

 northwest of the village, at the top of Wears Hill, are the earthworks of Abbotsbury Castle, an Iron Age hill fort.

In the 10th century a charter of King Edmund records a granting of land at Abbedesburi, a name which indicates the land may have once belonged to an abbot. In the 11th century King Cnut granted land at nearby Portesham to the Scandinavian thegn Orc (also Urki, Urk), who took up residence in the area with his wife Tola. The couple founded Abbotsbury Abbey and enriched it with a substantial amount of land.

In 1086, in the Domesday Book Abbotsbury was recorded as Abedesberie or Abodesberie; it had 62 households, 16 ploughlands,  of meadow and 2 mills. It was in the hundred of Uggescombe and the lords and tenants-in-chief were Abbotsbury Abbey and Hawise, wife of Hugh son of Grip.

Abbotsbury Abbey existed for 500 years, but was destroyed in the dissolution, although the abbey barn survived. Stone from the abbey was used in the construction of many buildings in the village, including the house of Abbotsbury's new owner, Sir Giles Strangways.

In 1644, during the English Civil War, Roundheads (Parliamentarians) and Cavaliers (Royalists) clashed at Abbotsbury. Parliamentarians besieged the Royalists in the church of St. Nicholas; two bullet holes from the fight remain in the Jacobean pulpit. The Strangways house which had replaced the Abbey after the dissolution was also the scene of a skirmish, as the Royalist Colonel Strangways resisted the Parliamentarians, who besieged the house and burned it. The house gunpowder store exploded in the fire and the house was destroyed, together with the old abbey records which had been stored there.

In the late 17th, and early 18th centuries Abbotsbury experienced several fires, resulting in the destruction of virtually all its medieval buildings. Most of the historic secular buildings in the village today were built from stone in the 17th and 18th centuries.

County historian John Hutchins (1698–1773) recorded that fishing was the main industry in the village, and 18th-century militia ballot lists reveal that husbandry was also particularly important. Ropemaking, basketry and the manufacture of cotton stockings were other notable trades within the village, with records indicating hemp and withies being grown in the area.

In the early 19th century, Abbotsbury's population grew steadily, from about 800 in 1801 to nearly 1,100 sixty years later.

During the Second World War, the coastal front was fortified and defended as a part of British anti-invasion preparations of World War II. Later, The Fleet Lagoon was used as a machine gun training range, and bouncing bombs were tested there, for Operation Chastise (the "Dambuster" sortie).

The modern village still has a long street of stone houses, many of which are thatched, with some dating from the 16th century. The street broadens at one point into an old market square. Parts of the street have a raised pavement. The village is surrounded by hills on all sides, except to the east; in 1905 Sir Frederick Treves described Abbotsbury as being "very pleasantly situated among the downs". Dorset-born broadcaster and writer Ralph Wightman described the village as "possibly the most interesting in Dorset".

Abbotsbury was the location for a small Royal Observer Corps Bunker, it was located near to Abbotsbury Hill. It was opened in 1959 and closed in 1968, it remains mostly intact.

Governance
In the United Kingdom national parliament, Abbotsbury is in the West Dorset parliamentary constituency.  , West Dorset's Member of Parliament (MP) is Chris Loder of the Conservative Party. In local government, Abbotsbury is governed by Dorset unitary authority at the highest tier, and Chesil Bank Group Parish Council (which also governs the parishes of Portesham, Fleet and Langton Herring) at the lowest tier.

In national parliament and local council elections, Dorset is divided into several electoral wards, with Abbotsbury being within Chickerell and Chesil Bank ward. In county council elections, Abbotsbury is in the Chickerell and Chesil Bank electoral division, one of 42 divisions that elect councillors to Dorset County Council. It includes the parishes of Abbotsbury, Chickerell, Fleet, Kingston Russell, Langton Herring, Littlebredy, Long Bredy, Portesham, Winterbourne Abbas and Winterbourne Steepleton. Dorset County Council estimate that in 2011 the division had a population of 7,900.

Demography
In the 2011 census, the civil parish—which includes the hamlet of Rodden to the east—had 256 dwellings, 219 households and a population of 481. 23.3% of residents were age 65 or over, compared to 16.4% for England as a whole.

The population of the civil parish in the censuses between 1921 and 2001 is shown in the table below:

Dorset County Council's 2013 mid-year estimate of the civil parish population is 480.

Notable people
Scientist James Lovelock, best known for proposing the Gaia hypothesis, lived in Abbotsbury in his later years.

Judge Sir David Neuberger took as his Life Peerage title Baron Neuberger of Abbotsbury in 2007.

Transport

Road
The B3157 road between Abbotsbury and Burton Bradstock is notable for its fine coastal views.

Bus
Abbotsbury is served by the First Hampshire & Dorset Jurassic Coaster branded services X52 (summer only) and X53 which provide connections to Axminster, Lyme Regis, Bridport, Weymouth, Lulworth Cove and Wool.

Railway
Between 1885 and 1952, Abbotsbury was served by the Abbotsbury Railway, a  branch from the main line to Weymouth. It was primarily designed for freight, in anticipation of the development of oil shale deposits and stone at Portesham, as well as iron ore at Abbotsbury which would be shipped to South Wales for processing.

Notable buildings
Nearly a hundred structures within the parish are listed by English Heritage for their historic or architectural interest. These include six structures listed as Grade I and six listed as Grade II*.

It is built entirely of stone, including the roof and even the panelled ceiling. The chapel overlooks the English Channel, and may have served as a beacon for sailors, warning of the nearby Isle of Portland. The chapel is listed as Grade I.

The Parish Church of St Nicholas dates from the 14th century but has had various revisions over the centuries. The tower contains three bells dating from 1773 and made by Thomas Castleman Bilbie of the Bilbie family in Cullompton. The chancel was classicised in the 18th century and still has its plastered barrel roof and fine altarpiece. There are also some 15th-century painted glass, a stone effigy of one of the abbots and a Jacobean canopied pulpit. The church is listed as Grade I.

Abbotsbury Abbey tithe barn was built around 1400. It measures  and is the world's largest thatched tithe barn. It has 23 bays, 11 of which have been unroofed since the 17th century. The 12 roofed bays are covered with thatch, though previously stone slabs were used. Part of the north wall has been destroyed. The barn is listed as Grade I.

Ilchester Estate

Swannery
Situated south of the village on the shore of the Fleet lagoon, Abbotsbury Swannery is over 600 years old, having previously been owned by the abbot and managed, using decoys, to provide meat for the abbey. When the abbey was destroyed the swannery passed to the earls of Ilchester, and today the decoys are used for monitoring and recording purposes. The swannery has a large colony of mute swans, as well as other waterfowl, and is open to the public. The site is an important nesting and breeding ground for the swans and, from May through the summer, cygnets can be seen at close quarters.

Subtropical gardens
Abbotsbury Subtropical Gardens were founded in 1765 by the Countess of Ilchester, as a kitchen garden for the nearby castle. Since then, the gardens have developed into a 20-acre (81,000 m²) site filled with exotic plants, many of which were newly discovered species when they were first introduced. There are formal and informal gardens, with woodland walks and walled gardens. In 1990 violent storms damaged many of the rare specimens, which have since been replaced by younger plants.

Amenities
Abbotsbury has a village hall, called the Strangways Village Hall; it is run by the Strangways Hall Committee and is a registered charity and available for hire. The village has two public houses, The Ilchester Arms and The Swan Inn, and several tearooms, small shops and businesses. The village also has a cricket ground.

See also 

 Abbotsbury Garland Day
 South West Coast Path
 Macmillan Way

References

Notes

General references

 Pitt-Rivers, Michael, 1968.  Dorset. London: Faber & Faber.
 Taylor, Christopher, 1970.  The Making of the Dorset Landscape. London: Hodder & Stoughton.

External links 
 Abbotsbury village website, produced by Abbotsbury Tourism & Traders Association
 Old photographs of the village

Villages in Dorset
Jurassic Coast
Civil parishes in Dorset
Massacres during the Wars of the Three Kingdoms
Massacres in 1664